Lee-Ming Institute of Technology (LIT) is a private university located in Taishan District, New Taipei, Taiwan.

LIT is accredited by the Ministry of Education in Taiwan and offers a range of undergraduate and graduate programs in various fields. LIT offers degree programs in a variety of disciplines, including engineering, business management, computer science, and design.  

The programs are designed to provide students with practical skills and knowledge that are relevant to the current job market.

History 
The university was established in 1969.

Faculties
 College of arts
 College of engineering and services
 College of fashion and creativity
 College of tourism and food

Transportation
The station is accessible north of Danfeng Station of Taipei Metro.

See also
 List of universities in Taiwan

References

External links

 

1969 establishments in Taiwan
Educational institutions established in 1969
Private universities and colleges in Taiwan
Technical universities and colleges in Taiwan
Universities and colleges in New Taipei